The Outlaw is a 1939 Argentine drama film directed by Orestes Caviglia and starring Agustín Irusta.

Cast
 Agustín Irusta
 Amelia Bence
 Carlos Perelli
 Roberto Escalada
 Ada Cornaro
 José Otal
 Sebastián Chiola

References

External links
 

1939 films
1939 drama films
Argentine drama films
1930s Spanish-language films
Argentine black-and-white films
Films directed by Orestes Caviglia
1930s Argentine films